Iveta Dapkutė (born 29 January 1993) is a Lithuanian professional tennis player.

Dapkutė has career-high WTA rankings of 911 in singles, achieved on 17 February 2020, and 1053 in doubles, set on 2 December 2019.

Dapkutė has represented Lithuania at the Billie Jean King Cup, making her debut in 2021.

ITF Finals

Doubles: 2 (1 title, 1 runner–up)

References

External links
 
 
 

1993 births
Living people
Lithuanian female tennis players